Jasmine Watson (born June 4, 1991, in South Bend, Indiana) plays center for the UMass women's basketball team.  She was named the 2010 Atlantic 10 Rookie of the Year and was selected to the 2010 Atlantic 10 All-Rookie Team. Jasmine plays overseas she average 9.3 pt 9.1 rebounds. She also trains with an organization called MAM.

Massachusetts statistics

Source

References

Living people
1991 births
Basketball players from South Bend, Indiana
UMass Minutewomen basketball players